Calcarsynotaxus is a genus of Australian araneomorph spiders in the family Physoglenidae, and was first described by J. Wunderlich in 1995.  it contains two species, found in Queensland and Western Australia: C. benrobertsi and C. longipes.

See also
 List of Physoglenidae species

References

Araneomorphae genera
Physoglenidae
Spiders of Australia